OMV (formerly abbreviation for Österreichische Mineralölverwaltung Aktiengesellschaft) is an Austrian multinational integrated oil, gas and petrochemical company which is headquartered in Vienna, Austria. The company is listed on the Vienna Stock Exchange. In the 2021 Forbes Global 2000, OMV Group was ranked as the 413th -largest public company in the world.

It is active in the oil and gas upstream and downstream businesses as well as in petrochemicals and plastics recycling.

History

The history of OMV began on July 3, 1956, when the company then known as "Österreichische Mineralölverwaltungs Aktiengesellschaft" was officially entered into the commercial register. Consequently, the Soviet Mineral Oil Administration (Sowjetische Mineralölverwaltung, SMV), a corporation formed during the Soviet zone of occupation in post-war Austria became "Österreichische Mineralölverwaltungs Aktiengesellschaft".

Four years later, in 1960, the company opened the Schwechat refinery near Vienna, in 1968 the first natural gas supply contract with the former USSR were entered.
At the end of 1987, 15% of OMV was privatized, making it the first public listing of a state-owned company in Austria. In 1990 the company opened its first filling station in Vienna on 26 June.
In 1998, OMV acquired a 25% stake in the plastics group, Borealis.

The International Petroleum Investment Company (IPIC) of Abu Dhabi acquired an initial 19.6% interest in the group at the end of 1994. The following year, the group changed its name from "ÖMV" to "OMV" because the umlaut on the "Ö" is not commonly used in many languages.

In the early 2000s, OMV expanded into Eastern Europe, by acquiring around 10% of Hungarian oil company, MOL and in 2003 it acquired the upstream division of Germany's Preussag Energie, expanding its filling station networks.

In 2004, OMV became the market leader in Central and Eastern Europe following the acquisition of 51% of Romanian oil and gas group Petrom which then constituted the largest acquisition in OMV's history.
In the same year, OMV increased its share capital, meaning that more than 50% of the company's shares were in free float for the first time. Following the sale of 50% of the subsidiary company Agrolinz Melamine International GmbH to IPIC in 2005, the Borealis group was taken over in full together with IPIC.

In 2006, OMV acquired a 34% stake in a Turkish oil company Petrol Ofisi. In the same year, the board members of OMV and Verbund, the Austrian utility group announced plans for a merger. However, this collapsed due to resistance from Austrian MPs.

OMV increased its stake in Hungarian oil group MOL to 20.2% in 2007. OMV then sold its entire stake in March 2009 after MOL rejected a takeover bid in 2008 and the European Commission imposed tough restrictions for an approval of the deal. In late 2011, OMV acquired the stake held by Dogan Holding in Petrol Ofisi, which further increased its stake in the company to 95.75%.

In 2012, the Domino-1 well in the Romanian Black Sea exploration license Neptun was the most significant discovery in that year, which has the potential to be OMV's most important gas discovery ever.

On October 31, 2013, the acquisition deal with Norwegian Statoil containing participations in oil and gas fields and in development projects in Norway and the UK was closed. With 2.65 bn USD, this then was the largest transaction in OMV's history.

A divestment agreement for the 45% stake in Bayernoil was signed in December 2013. The sale was closed in June 2014.

In 2015 OMV increased its interest in Petrol Ofisi to 100%,. Two years later, in 2017, OMV sold Petrol Ofisi to Vitol Group

In 2017, OMV – together with ENGIE, Shell, Uniper and Wintershall – signed financing agreements with Nord Stream 2 AG to build the 1,200 km Nord Stream 2 gas pipeline from Russia to Germany.
In September 2018, OMV became the only Austrian company listed on the Dow Jones Sustainability Index.

In January 2019, OMV took a stake of 50% in the joint venture "SapuraOMV Upstream Sdn. Bhd.", a leading oil and gas company in Malaysia.

In January 2019, OMV signed an agreement to acquire a 15% stake in ADNOC Refining (Abu Dhabi National Oil Company) in Abu Dhabi.

In March 2020, OMV increased its holding in Borealis to 75%, thereby transforming OMV from a pure oil and gas company into a gas, oil and chemicals group. 
At the end of 2020, OMV started up Austria's then largest photovoltaic plant with 11.4 MWp in Schönkirchen (Lower Austria).

On May 31, 2021, OMV and Verbund close purchase of 51% interest in Gas Connect Austria. On June 1, OMV appoints Alfred Stern as new CEO. On June 8, OMV and MOL Group reach agreement for MOL Group to acquire OMV Slovenia.

On March 5, 2022, OMV announces to no longer pursues investments in Russia.

In December 2022, it was announced the state-owned, Abu Dhabi National Oil Company (ADNOC), has acquired a 24.9% stake in OMV.

Finance information

Shareholder structure 2021
ÖBAG (31.5%)
Mubadala Petroleum and Petrochemicals Holding Company (24.9%)
Industrial Investors (30.6%)
Unidentified free float (1.8%)
Retail positions and miscellaneous (12.2%)
Employee share programs (0.4%)
Treasury Shares (0.1%)

Shareholdings
The most important shareholdings of OMV Aktiengesellschaft are listed below, with other shareholdings held by the appropriate business segments:
 Borealis AG (75%)
 OMV Petrom SA (51%)

Business segments

Exploration and production
In exploration and production, OMV explores, develops, and produces oil and gas in its four core regions of Central and Eastern Europe, the Middle East and Africa, the North Sea, and Asia-Pacific. In 2021, daily production was 486 kboe/d (equal to 177.5 mn boe). While natural gas accounted for 59% of total production, oil and NGL flows made up 41%. At yearend 2021, proven reserves amounted to 1,295 mn boe.

Refining and marketing
OMV's refining and marketing business refines and markets fuels and natural gas. It operates three inland refineries in Europe and holds a strong market position in the areas where its refineries are located, serving a strong branded retail network and commercial customers. In the Middle East, it owns 15% of ADNOC Refining and ADNOC Global Trading. The processing capacity of its refineries amounted to around 500 kboe/d.

Chemicals and materials
In chemicals and materials, OMV, through its subsidiary Borealis, is one of the world's leading providers of advanced and circular polyolefin solutions with total polyolefin sales of 5.9 mn t in 2021, and a European market leader in base chemicals, fertilizers and plastics recycling. The company supplies services and products to customers worldwide through Borealis and its two important joint ventures: Borouge (with ADNOC, based in the UAE and Singapore) and Baystar™ (with TotalEnergies, based in the US).

Controversies

War crimes in Sudan
In June 2010, the European Coalition on Oil in Sudan (ECOS) published the report "Unpaid Debt", that called upon the governments of Sweden, Austria, and Malaysia to look into allegations Lundin Petroleum (as operator), OMV and Petronas may have been complicit in the commission of war crimes and crimes against humanity whilst operating in Block 5A, South Sudan (then Sudan), during the period of 1997 to 2003. The reported crimes include indiscriminate attacks and intentional targeting of civilians, burning of shelters, pillage, destruction of objects necessary for survival, unlawful killing of civilians, rape of women, abduction of children, torture, and forced displacement by government troops. When the consortium that OMV took part in operated in Block 5A, approximately 12.000 people died and 160.000 were violently displaced by government troops from their land and homes, many forever. Satellite pictures taken between 1994 and 2003 show that the activities coincided with a spectacular drop in agricultural land use in its concession area 

In June 2010, the Swedish public prosecutor for international crimes opened a criminal investigation into links between Sweden and the reported crimes. In 2016, Lundin Petroleum's Chairman Ian Lundin and CEO Alex Schneiter (as operator) were informed that they were the suspects of the investigation. Sweden's Government gave the green light for the Public Prosecutor in October 2018 to indict the two top executives On 1 November 2018, the Swedish Prosecution Authority notified Lundin Petroleum AB that the company may be liable to a corporate fine and forfeiture of economic benefits of SEK 3,285 (app. €315 million) for involvement in war crimes and crimes against humanity. Consequently, the company itself would also be charged, albeit indirectly, and will be legally represented in court. On 15 November 2018 the suspects were served with the draft charges and the case files. They would be indicted for aiding and abetting international crimes and may face life imprisonment if found guilty. The trial is likely to open early in 2022 and may take two years.

The Swedish war crimes investigation raises the issue of access to remedy and reparation for victims of human rights violations linked with business activities. In May 2016, representatives of communities in Block 5A claimed their right to remedy and reparation and called upon OMV, Lundin Petroleum and Petronas and their shareholders to pay off their debt to them. A conviction in Sweden may provide some level of remedy and reparation for the few victims of human rights violations who will testify in court, but not for the other 200,000 victims who will not be represented in court. The Swedish court cannot impose obligations upon OMV.

On 23 May 2019, the T.M.C. Asser Institute for International Law in The Hague organized the conference 'Towards criminal liability of corporations for human rights violations: The Lundin case in Sweden'.

OMV endorses the UN Guiding Principles on Business and Human Rights, acknowledging the duty of business enterprises to contribute to effective remedy of adverse impact that it has caused or contributed to. The company has never publicly showed an interest in the adverse impacts of its activities on the communities in its concession area. According to the Dutch peace organisation PAX, the companies OMV, Lundin Petroleum, Petronas, as well as their shareholders are disregarding the human rights standards that they claim to respect, notably the OECD Guidelines and UN Guiding Principles, because they,
A. never conducted an appropriate due diligence for their Sudanese operations;
B. made no effort to know their human rights impacts; and
C. do not show how they address alleged adverse human rights impacts.

OMV (Sudan) Exploration GmbH was a wholly owned subsidiary of OMV AG, and held a 26.1% share in the a license as part of the consortium that appointed Lundin as operator to explore and develop oil deposits in Block 5A. It sold its Sudanese assets in 2004 with a net profit of $55 million As the operator of the consortium, Lundin Petroleum was responsible for day-to-day management but its managers stood under the supervision of the Operating Committee, that exercised "overall direction and control of all matters pertaining to the Joint Operations and the Joint Property". OMV was permanently represented in the Operating Committee and has never publicly distanced itself from any of its decisions.

Between 2001 and 2003, OMV met repeatedly with European human rights advocates led by Sudan Platform Austria, but the company took no effective measures to prevent involvement in human rights violations or undo the adverse impact of Lundin's operations. On April 6, 2001, OMV wrote to Human Rights Watch: "We have reached the conclusion that, despite problems, the influx of oil revenues could improve the social and humanitarian conditions of the Sudanese. Oil exploration activities also represent immediate benefits to the local population, in terms of employment, infrastructure developments and humanitarian assistance... Our role is to constantly monitor the situation on the ground and to turn our perception of business ethics into reality by responsible action. In 2002, OMV nevertheless commissioned an independent report on the human rights situation in Block 5A, that has not been made public.

While Block 5A was operated by Lundin, OMV was a participant in the consortium, the suspicions against the consortium's top managers therefore also concern OMV. The Austrian State's owns 31% of OMV's shares. According to the UN Guiding Principles, which is endorsed by Austria, an abuse of human rights by a business enterprise that is wholly or partially controlled by a State, may entail a violation of that State's own international law obligations.

Petrom
The acquisition of 51% stake in Petrom was considered controversial as the privatisation contract was not made public and it consists of several disputed clauses.

The privatisation allegedly produced a market monopoly. Critics say that OMV can use the resources Petrom owns until their exhaustion. Also fixing of tax for gas and oil exploration at 3 to 13.5 percent from the final delivery price for 10 years was criticised. Some critics claimed, that the price €1.5 billion was too low.

On 13 December 2022, OMV Petrom was convicted by the Couter of Justice from Gaiesti, Romania of Involuntary manslaughter case. The Local Court Gaiesti ruled its decision in the file where OMV Petrom SA was sent to trial for involuntary manslaughter. The accusation is referring to an incident which occurred in Cobia in 2016 and resulted in the death of a child.
OMV Petrom was found guilty and was convicted to a punishment of a criminal fine amounting to RON 28,000. On the civil side, the court assessed the degree of fault of OMV Petrom SA at 50% and the company was obliged to pay moral damages in total amount of EUR 135,000 to the victim's family and material damages and other expenses in total amount of RON 22,000. The court ordered the complementary measure consisting in the one-year suspension of the activity of oil exploitation wells within the radius of Dâmboviţa county which, at the date when the decision becomes final, do not have a completely closed and locked perimeter or which do no have a well cellar grate installed. The court also ordered the publication of the decision of conviction, in extract. .

MOL
In June 2007 OMV made an unsolicited bid to take over MOL, which was rejected by the Hungarian company. MOL criticised OMV's advertisement in which OMV had suggested the two had already worked together on the European market. MOL thought that to be misleading and unethical and asked OMV to remove the name MOL from those advertisements. OMV dismissed its bid after negative results of the investigation by the European competition authorities.
OMV sold its entire stake to Surgutneftegas in March 2009.

New Zealand
On 10 April 2019 OMV announced that it would drill up to ten wells off the Otago, New Zealand coast. The decision was met with indications by local environmental groups, who had successfully fought previous attempts to drill for fossil fuels in the area, that OMV could "expect resistance". In November 2019 an OMV supply vessel in Timaru was occupied for 57 hours by 27 protesters, and 16 people were arrested. In March 2020 two members of Extinction Rebellion Ōtautahi intercepted and boarded an OMV mobile drilling rig in the Marlborough Sounds from an inflatable boat, intending to occupy it for a week, but due to sickness of one of the protestors, the occupation was abandoned after 14 hours. The protestors came on board of the rig and were flown to New Plymouth and served with a trespass notice.

See also

List of petroleum companies
OMV Petrom
Petrol Ofisi

References

External links

 ÖBIB
 OMV Petrom
 Borealis
 Gas Connect Austria
 Central European Gas Hub
Vienna Stock Exchange: Market Data OMV AG

Oil and gas companies of Austria
Companies based in Vienna
Non-renewable resource companies established in 1956
Austrian brands
Companies listed on the Wiener Börse
Companies listed on the Frankfurt Stock Exchange
Energy companies established in 1956
Austrian companies established in 1956
Multinational companies headquartered in Austria